Dorothea Ida Eveliina Witikka (born Dorothea Ida Eveliina Ista; 12 December 1932 – 20 February 2014), better known by her stage name Tea Ista, was a Finnish actress. She began her acting career in 1952. She was born in Evijärvi.

Ista died after a serious illness on 20 February 2014 in Espoo. She was aged 81. She was outlived by her daughter, Minna Maria, with her late husband Jack Witikka.

References

External links

 

1932 births
2014 deaths
People from Evijärvi
Finnish television actresses
Finnish film actresses
Finnish stage actresses
20th-century Finnish actresses